Love Is a Sometimes Thing is a studio album by American country singer-songwriter Bill Anderson. It was released in June 1970 on Decca Records and was produced by Owen Bradley. It was Anderson's fourteenth studio album since signing with the Decca label in 1958. Its only single, the title track, would become a major hit on the Billboard country chart in 1970. The album itself would also reach peak positions on the country albums chart following its release.

Background and content
Love Is a Sometimes Thing was recorded between 1968 and 1970 at Bradley's Barn, a studio located in Mount Juliet, Tennessee. The studio was owned by the album's producer, Owen Bradley. The album would be Anderson's fourteenth studio recording as well as his fourteenth to be produced by Bradley. The album consisted of 11 songs. Four of the album's tracks were written by Anderson himself. Among the song-composed tunes was the track, "You and Your Sweet Love". This song would become a major hit for Connie Smith around the same time. The title track was written by Jan Howard, a frequent collaborator of Anderson's. Howard would later cut her own version for her 1970 album Rock Me Back to Little Rock. The album also included cover versions of previously-recorded songs. Among these tracks was Glen Campbell's "Honey Come Back". Another track was "My Elusive Dreams", originally recorded as a duet between David Houston and Tammy Wynette.

Release and reception

Love Is a Sometimes Thing was released in June 1970 on Decca Records. It was issued as a vinyl LP, with six songs on side one and five songs on side two. After spending 15 weeks on the Billboard Top Country Albums chart, the record peaked at number ten in August 1970. It became one of several top ten Billboard albums for Anderson.

The title track was released as a single in January 1970. The song reached number five on the Billboard Hot Country Singles chart in May, after spending 15 weeks on the chart. The song also peaked at number ten on the RPM Country Singles chart in Canada, becoming his fifth consecutive solo top-ten hit on that chart. Love Is a Sometimes Thing received a positive response from critics. Billboard gave it a positive response in its June 1970 issue of the magazine. "Here's a top-of-the-album chart winner for Anderson," writers commented. The album would later be reviewed by Allmusic, who gave it a rating of 3.5 stars.

Track listing

Personnel
All credits are adapted from the liner notes of Love Is a Sometimes Thing.

Musical personnel
 Bill Anderson – lead vocals
 Harold Bradley – guitar
 Steve Chapman – guitar
 Johnny Gimble – mandolin, clarinet
 Roy Huskey – bass
 The Jordanaires – background vocals
 Grady Martin – guitar
 Len Miller – drums
 Hal Rugg – steel guitar
 Jerry Smith – piano
 Jimmy Wilson – guitar
 Jimmy Woodard – organ

Technical personnel
 Owen Bradley – record producer

Chart performance

Release history

References

1970 albums
Albums produced by Owen Bradley
Bill Anderson (singer) albums
Decca Records albums